Wilson de Oliveira Riça (born 13 March 1950), commonly known as Wilsinho, is a Brazilian football manager.

Career
Wilsinho was the head coach of the Brazil women's national team at the 1999 FIFA Women's World Cup.

References

External links
 
 
 Wilson de Oliveira Riça at Soccerdonna.de 

1950 births
Living people
Brazilian football managers
Women's association football managers
Brazil women's national football team managers
1999 FIFA Women's World Cup managers